Sport Club Barroso, commonly known as Barroso, was a Brazilian football club based in Maceió, Alagoas state. They won the Campeonato Alagoano once.

History
The club was founded on 11 June 1921. They won the Campeonato Alagoano in 1946, and finished in the second place in the 1947 edition, finishing behind Alexandria. The club folded in 1951.

Stadium
Esporte Clube Barroso played their home games at Estádio Gustavo Paiva, nicknamed Estádio do Mutange. The stadium has a maximum capacity of 6,000 people.

Achievements

 Campeonato Alagoano:
 Winners (1): 1946
 Runners-up (1): 1947

References

Defunct football clubs in Alagoas
Association football clubs established in 1921
Association football clubs disestablished in 1951
1921 establishments in Brazil
1951 disestablishments in Brazil